Pitt Township may refer to:

Pitt Township, Wyandot County, Ohio
Pitt Township, Allegheny County, Pennsylvania

Township name disambiguation pages